Capital punishment was abolished in Liechtenstein. It was abolished for murder in 1987 and for treason in 1989.

The last death sentence was pronounced in 1977, when a 42-year-old man was sentenced to be hanged for the 1976 murders of his wife and two children; the sentence was later commuted by Franz Josef II to 15 years of imprisonment. 

The last execution occurred in 1785, when Barbara Erni, a 42-year-old homeless woman from Altenstadt in Feldkirch was beheaded for burglary and theft.

References

Law of Liechtenstein
Liechtenstei
Death in Liechtenstein
Human rights in Liechtenstein
1989 disestablishments in Europe